Arnica cordifolia is a species of arnica in the sunflower family, known by the common name heartleaf arnica. It is native to western North America.

Description
It has two to four pairs of leaves on the stem, each on a long petiole. The leaves are heart-shaped to arrowhead-shaped and finely toothed along the edges. The inflorescence bears one or more daisylike flower heads  in width, lined with white-haired phyllaries and sometimes studded with resin glands. The center of each head contains golden yellow disc florets and a fringe of 10–15 bright golden ray florets approaching  in maximum length. The flowers usually bloom from April to June, but sometimes do so as late as September.

Seeds are dispersed on the wind. An individual plant can live 12 years, surviving periodic wildfire by resprouting from its long, slender rhizome afterward.

The species could be confused with the similar Arnica latifolia, from which it can be distinguished by the leaves. The leaves of A.cordifolia are larger and heart-shaped.

Distribution and habitat
It is native to western North America from Alaska to California to New Mexico, as far east as Ontario and Michigan.

Uses
The dried leaves can be made into a poultice or tincture to treat strains and bruises.

References

External links

Jepson Manual Treatment
Calphotos Photo gallery, University of California

cordifolia
Plants described in 1834
Flora of Subarctic America
Flora of Western Canada
Flora of the Northwestern United States
Flora of the Southwestern United States
Flora of New Mexico
Flora of Ontario
Flora without expected TNC conservation status